Cruze may refer to:
 Chevrolet Cruze, a compact car, and formerly a crossover SUV produced by General Motors.
 Chester Cruze, a former member of the Ohio House of Representatives
 James Cruze (1884–1942), silent film actor and film director

See also
 Rupert D'Cruze, British conductor
 Cruz
 Cruse (disambiguation)
 Cruise (disambiguation)
 Kruse (disambiguation)